Sylvester G. Clements (born May 1, 1936) is an American Republican politician, dairy farmer, and businessman.

Career
Born in La Crosse, Wisconsin, Clements graduated from Aquinas High School in 1954 and served in the Wisconsin National Guard. Clements was a dairy farmer, truck driver, and businessman. He served on the La Crosse County, Wisconsin Board of Supervisors and on the Washington Town Board.

Legislative service
He was elected to the Wisconsin State Assembly's newly created 94th District in 1984, defeating Steve Doyle by 10,959 to Doyle's 10,190.

He ran for re-election in 1986, but was unseated by Democratic former State Representative Virgil Roberts, in a race tight enough that a recount was held. The final vote was 8,794 for Roberts to 8,603 for Clements.

West Salem School Board
Clements served on the school board of the West Salem School District. He announced that he will not seek re-election to the West Salem School Board in the Wisconsin April spring election 2020.

References

1936 births
Living people
Politicians from La Crosse, Wisconsin
Aquinas High School (La Crosse, Wisconsin) alumni
Wisconsin National Guard personnel
Businesspeople from Wisconsin
Farmers from Wisconsin
School board members in Wisconsin
County supervisors in Wisconsin
Republican Party members of the Wisconsin State Assembly
Wisconsin city council members